Omorgus alatus is a species of hide beetle in the subfamily Omorginae.

References

alatus
Beetles described in 1888